Clear Creek is a small river in Southeast Texas in the United States, which channels much of the run-off in southeast Harris County into Clear Lake and Galveston Bay. Much of the length of the stream forms the boundary between Harris County and Galveston County and all of the boundary with Brazoria County. It originates in the Blue Ridge Oilfield in Fort Bend County.

Water quality
The Texas Parks and Wildlife Department (TPWD) has issued a Fish Consumption Advisory for Clear Creek due to the presence of polychlorinated biphenyls (PCBs). The advisory states "Persons should not consume any species of fish from these waters."

See also

Clear Creek Independent School District
List of rivers of Texas

References 

 Texas State Historical Association

Rivers of Texas
Rivers of Fort Bend County, Texas
Rivers of Harris County, Texas
Rivers of Galveston County, Texas